Haitang Bay is one of the five major bays in Sanya, Hainan Province, China.

This  beach is located in Haitangwan Town, Sanya, and Yingzhou Town, Lingshui. To its south are Yalong Bay and Wuzhizhou Island.

A number of resort hotels are located along the beach. Atlantis Sanya opened in 2018. The resort cost US$1.74 billion.

References

External links

Haitangbay.com
Official site
Haitang Bay Sanya 

Bays of Hainan
Beaches of China
Sanya